Khalanga or Baitadi Khalanga is a town and seat of Baitadi District in the Sudurpashchim Province of western Nepal. At the time of the 1991 Nepal census it had a population of 5,352 and had 1011 houses in the town.

References

Populated places in Baitadi District